Craigmont may refer to:

 Craigmont, Idaho, United States
 Craigmont, Ontario, Canada

See also
 Craigmont High School, a public high school in Memphis, Tennessee
 Craigmount (disambiguation)